Islam Khan may refer to:
Islam Khan I - also known as Islam Khan Chisti  (died 1613)
Islam Khan II - also known as Islam Khan Mashhadi (died 1647)
Islam Khan III - also known as Islam Khan Badakhshi (died 1663)
Islam Khan IV - also known as Islam Khan Rumi (died 1673)
Islam Khan V - Mir Ahmad Barkhurdar Khan (d. 1734)
Islam Khan (umpire) (born 1953), Pakistani cricket umpire

Mughal nobility